Moviedrome was a British television cult film series, produced by the BBC and transmitted on BBC2 from 8 May 1988 to 9 July 2000. Its remit was to broadcast a selection of cult films each with an introduction, first by film director Alex Cox and later by film critic Mark Cousins. The producer and director of the series was Nick Freand Jones. During its run, 207 different films were shown.

History
Moviedrome went into development in the late 1980s, when BBC producer, Nick Freand-Jones put together the idea of screening a number of films available within the BBC archives, where they had licensing rights to titles, some of which that had not yet been broadcast. The idea followed a specific film, considered a cult classic, that would be shown on a weekly basis, preceded by an introduction on the film's background, much like a similar BBC series, titled The Film Club, which ran from 1986 to 1991.

Jones looked to director and screenwriter, Alex Cox to present the series. Cox, known for his directorial features Repo Man, Sid and Nancy and Walker, had previously introduced John Boorman's crime thriller Point Blank and Robert Altman's The Long Goodbye for The Film Club, and was chosen as the front-man for Moviedrome. Cox applied his own unique style to each introduction, as he would educate the viewer, in detail, on the particular film, exploring the genres and themes present within them. As a rule, early screenings of the series were limited to English language-only films, where as, foreign acquisitions had to be dubbed.

On 8 May 1988, Moviedrome premiered on BBC2, and remained a popular late-night Sunday staple for several years, opening with a previously unseen version of The Wicker Man, containing newly restored footage. During Cox's era on the show, he presented 141 films; those selected consisting of a wide variety of genres, including westerns, Crime thrillers, horrors, sci-fi films and film noir. Titles included Johnny Guitar, One-Eyed Jacks, The Good, the Bad and the Ugly, Five Easy Pieces, Halloween, An American Werewolf in London, Badlands, What Ever Happened to Baby Jane?, The Thing from Another World, Sweet Smell of Success, Sunset Boulevard, Carrie, Invasion of the Body Snatchers and its 1978 remake. Some even received UK network premieres, such as, The Long Hair of Death, Carnival of Souls, The Terminator, Vamp, Knightriders, Manhunter, Mad Max 2, Dead Ringers, Rabid, Cry-Baby, and Cox's 1987 film Walker. The final film presented was Kiss Me Deadly, when the series concluded on 11 September 1994.

The series was revived in 1997, when Alex Cox was replaced with filmmaker and critic, Mark Cousins. Cousins' presentation style differed greatly from Cox's, as well as the film selection being that of more contemporary works, rather than the usual classics. Cousins' was also less critical, where as Cox didn’t shy away from pointing out a particular film's bad points if necessary. on 8 June 1997, Moviedrome returned with Scarface, the first of 66 films presented by Cousins'. This was followed by Logan's Run, The Fog, Vanishing Point, All That Heaven Allows, Shaft, Thunderbolt and Lightfoot, Videodrome, Walkabout, Don't Look Now, and several network premieres, with Dazed and Confused, Exotica, La Haine, Spanking the Monkey, Darkness in Tallinn, Storyville, Liebestraum, Highway Patrolman, Funny Bones, Leon, Clockers and Prêt-à-Porter. The final episode screened on 9 July 2000 with  The Last American Hero.

Series overview

Presented by Alex Cox

Season 1 (1988)

Season 2 (1989)

Season 3 (1990)

Season 4 (1991)

Season 5 (1992)

Season 6 (1993)

Season 7 (1994)

Presented by Mark Cousins

Season 8 (1997)

Season 9 (1998)

Season 10 (1998)

Season 11 (1999)

Season 12 (2000)

Note: Although some episodes (including both singular, and the second film of the double bill episodes) were broadcast after 12:00am and into the early hours of Monday mornings, they will still remain as dated for the Sunday night broadcast schedules.

Notes

References

External links

1988 British television series debuts
2000 British television series endings
English-language television shows